Bombo Regional Hospital is the referral regional hospital in Tanga, Tanzania. It was built by the Germans in 1901, the first hospital in East Africa.

The hospital is affiliated with the National Institute of Medical Research center in Tanga, to which it is adjacent.

The Tanga Aids Working Group, a member of Eastern and Southern Africa Regional Initiative on Traditional Medicine and AIDS, is headquartered at Bombo Hospital.

References

External links

National Institute of Medical Research Centre, Tanga
Tanga AIDS Working Group

Hospitals in Tanzania
Buildings and structures in Tanga, Tanzania
1900s establishments in German East Africa
Hospitals established in 1901